In differential geometry, given a metaplectic structure  on a -dimensional symplectic manifold  the symplectic spinor bundle is the Hilbert space bundle  associated to the metaplectic structure via the metaplectic representation. The metaplectic representation of the metaplectic group — the two-fold covering of the symplectic group — gives rise to an infinite rank vector bundle; this is the symplectic spinor construction due to Bertram Kostant.

A section of the symplectic spinor bundle  is called a symplectic spinor field.

Formal definition
Let  be a metaplectic structure on a symplectic manifold  that is, an equivariant lift of the symplectic frame bundle  with respect to the double covering  

The symplectic spinor bundle  is defined  to be the Hilbert space bundle
 
associated to the metaplectic structure  via the metaplectic representation  also called the Segal–Shale–Weil  representation of  Here, the notation  denotes the group of unitary operators acting on a Hilbert space 

The Segal–Shale–Weil representation  is an infinite dimensional unitary representation
of the metaplectic group  on the space of all complex
valued square Lebesgue integrable square-integrable functions  Because of the infinite dimension,
the Segal–Shale–Weil representation is not so easy to handle.

Notes

Further reading
 

Symplectic geometry
Structures on manifolds
Algebraic topology